The Trojan Battle Order or Trojan Catalogue is an epic catalogue in the second book of the Iliad listing the allied contingents that fought for Troy in the Trojan War. The catalogue is noted for its deficit of detail compared to the immediately preceding Catalogue of Ships, which lists the Greek contingents, and for the fact that only a few of the many Trojans mentioned in the Iliad appear there.

Historicity question
Structurally the Trojan Battle Order is evidently inserted to balance the preceding Catalogue of Ships. It is, however, much shorter. Denys Page summarizes the prevailing explanation that "the Catalogues are substantially Mycenaean compositions rather expanded than altered by the Ionians" . Noting that the Greek catalogue occupies 265 lines but the Trojan catalogue only 61, Page wonders why the Ionian authors know so little about their native land and concludes they are not describing it but are reforming poetry inherited in oral form from Mycenaean times .

Some examples of Mycenaean knowledge are :
Alybe in the catalog is the birthplace of silver, yet Hecataeus, the Ionian geographer, does not know where it is.
The catalog mentions Mount Phthires near Miletus and the Maeander. Hecataeus supposes it was the prior name of Latmus.

There is also some internal evidence that the Trojan catalogue was not part of the Iliad but was a distinct composition pre-dating the Trojan War and incorporated later into the Iliad :
Of the 26 Trojans in the catalog, only 5 appear among the 216 in the Iliad.
The major Trojan leaders: Priam, Paris, Helenus and a few others do not appear in the catalog at all.
 At Il. 2.858 the Mysians are commanded by Chromis and Ennomus; at 14.511 ff. by Gyrtios.
 At 2.858 the Mysians live in Asia Minor; at 13.5, Thrace.
 At. 2.827 Apollo gives Pandaros his bow; at 4.105 ff it is made by a craftsman.

Page cites several more subtle instances of the disconnectedness of the Trojan catalog from the Iliad; neither is it connected to the catalog of Greek forces. Another like it appears in the Cypria .

The catalogue in detail
The catalogue lists 16 contingents from 12 ethnonyms under 26 leaders . They lived in 33 places identified by toponyms.

Analyses

The list includes the Trojans themselves, led by Hector, and various allies. As observed by G. S. Kirk, it follows a geographical pattern comparable to that of the Greek catalogue, dealing first with Troy, then with the Troad, then radiating outwards on four successive routes, the most distant peoples on each route being described as "from far away" . The allied contingents are said to have spoken multiple languages, requiring orders to be translated by their individual commanders. Nothing is said of the Trojan language; the Carians are specifically said to be barbarian-speaking, possibly because their language was distinct from the contemporaneous lingua franca of western Anatolia.

The classical Greek historian Demetrius of Scepsis, native of Scepsis in the hills above Troy, wrote a vast study of the "Trojan Battle Order" under that title (Greek Trōikos diakosmos). The work is lost; brief extracts from it are quoted by Athenaeus and Pausanias, while Strabo cites it frequently in his own discussion of the geography of northwestern Anatolia.

See also 
Trojan Leaders

Notes

References

 

Watkins, Calvert, "The language of the Trojans" in Troy and the Trojan War: a symposium held at Bryn Mawr College, October 1984 ed. M. J. Mellink (Bryn Mawr, 1986).

Trojan War
Iliad
Lists of ancient Indo-European peoples and tribes